"Hope & Dreams" (stylized as "HOPE & DREAMS") is a song recorded by Japanese singer Misia for her eleventh studio album New Morning. It was released digitally as a promotional single by Ariola Japan on March 19, 2014.

Background and release
"Hope & Dreams" was released to digital download on iTunes and Mora on March 19, 2014, two weeks before the release of New Morning. Misia premiered the song in concert, during her Hoshizora no Live VII 15th Celebration concert tour. Misia also performed the song at the opening ceremony of the 6th Special Olympics Nippon National Summer Games, held in Fukuoka on November 1, 2014.

Composition
"Hope & Dreams" was written by Misia, composed by Toshiaki Matsumoto and arranged by DJ Gomi. The trio set out to create a danceable song with an uplifting message. The song was the official song for the pride event Tokyo Rainbow Week 2014, where Misia was recognized for her contribution with the Culture Award.

Chart performance
"Hope & Dreams" charted at number 97 on the Billboard Japan Hot 100.

Credits and personnel
Personnel

 Vocals – Misia
 Backing vocals – Adam Joseph
 Songwriting – Misia, Toshiaki Matsumoto
 Arrangement, programming – DJ Gomi
 Strings arrangement, conducting – Takayuki Hattori
 Guitar – Yasuo Yamada
 Strings group – Gen Ittetsu Strings
 First violin – Gen Ittetsu, Reina Ushiyama,  Cameroun Maki, Kaoru Kuroki, Yayoi Fujita, Tomoshige Yamamoto
 Second violin – Takuya Mori, Yuko Kajitani, Azusa Kawasuso, Kiyo Kido, Kazuha Takahashi
 Viola – Daisuke Kadowaki, Kumi Nakajima, Chikako Nishimura, Shoko Miki
 Cello – Masami Horisawa, Toshiyuki Muranaka
 Mixing – Dave Darlington
 Engineering – Masahiro Kawaguchi, DJ Gomi
 Mastering – Herb Powers Jr.

Charts

References

2014 songs
Misia songs
Songs written by Misia
LGBT-related songs